Batocera woodlarkiana is a species of beetle in the family Cerambycidae. It was described by Xavier Montrouzier in 1855. It is found on Woodlark Island, in Papua New Guinea, and is very rare.

References

Batocerini
Endemic fauna of Papua New Guinea
Beetles of Oceania
Insects of Papua New Guinea
Woodlark Islands
Beetles described in 1855